Titan was a floating crane that operated in Sydney Harbour from 1919 until 1991. She was fabricated in Carlisle in the United Kingdom, then sent to Cockatoo Island Dockyard in Sydney for assembly, before entering service with the Royal Australian Navy (RAN).

After being declared surplus to requirements, the crane became the property of Cockatoo Island Dockyard, which operated it until the dockyard's closure in 1991. Although heritage-listed, Titan was sold to a Singaporean company, and authorisation was given to tow her to Singapore in 1992. During the tow, the crane's barge inverted on 24 December, and the crane was scuttled five days later.

Design and construction
Titan was fabricated in the United Kingdom during World War I by Cowans, Sheldon & Company of Carlisle, then transported to Australia in parts for assembly at Cockatoo Island Dockyard, Sydney. Ordered on 5 October 1916, construction at Cockatoo commenced on 7 March 1917. The crane was launched on 5 December 1917. However, during construction, the 40-ton lead screws for the crane's jib arm were lost when the merchant ship Afric was torpedoed. The crane could be used in a limited capability, although it was not until 1919 that replacement screws of sufficient quality were acquired. Titan was completed on 3 December 1919. On completion, the crane was handed over to the RAN.

Two  counterweights were used to ballast the load; water ballast tanks could also be used, but this rarely occurred. The crane was not self-propelled, and required two or three tugboats to manoeuvre her around. Power for lifting and rotating was supplied by a coal-fired boiler supplying three steam generators (two 220 kilowatt generators and a 44 kilowatt auxiliary). The only connection between the crane arm and the lattice mast were drive shafts for the slewing (rotational) motors.

Operational history
Titans main purpose was to provide heavy lifting services for Cockatoo Island Dockyard; installing ships' boilers and propulsion equipment, transporting heavy machinery to and from the island, and launching small craft. The crane also saw use unloading heavy deck cargo from ships, assisted in the construction of power plants, bridges, and other structures around Sydney Harbour and the attached tributaries, and was occasionally used for the salvage of vessels sunk in the harbour. Early in her career, the crane was used throughout the entire harbour, but the barge's poor seakeeping ability made it dangerous to tow the crane across Sydney Heads, and she was later banned from operating north and east of Bradleys Head.

A modernisation of Titan began in the late 1960s. During the modernisation, the RAN decided that the crane was surplus to requirements, and suspended the upgrade in 1975. Cockatoo Island Dockyard saw the value of keeping Titan in service, and continued the upgrades, including replacement of the steam-powered system with diesel generators.

In 1989, surveyors refused to renew the crane's port craft licence because of the age of the vessel; in particular, rivets used during the pontoon's construction were showing signs of wear-and-tear. The dwindling need for the crane's services and the cost of completely refurbishing the craft saw the dockyard remove Titan from commercial service in 1991. Approval for short-term projects was granted over the following two years, including the unloading and reloading of the locomotive Flying Scotsman during its visit to Australia, and the dismantling of a shore-based crane at Cockatoo Island.

Sinking
After the closure of Cockatoo Island Dockyard in 1991, the Australian government decided to sell Titan. She was initially sold in April 1992 to a New Zealand company, which originally intended to return her to service. However, there was no longer any demand for the crane's services in Sydney, and Titan was on-sold to the Singapore-based Wirana Shipping Corporation in December 1992. Although Titan was listed for protection under the Protection of Moveable Cultural Heritage Act 1986, permission to export the crane to Singapore was approved on the condition that she return to Sydney by July 1995. The crane left Sydney Harbour on 23 December 1992, towed by Wirana's Rapuhia, a former research vessel. Although Rapuhia was physically capable of towing the crane, she was unregistered, and several safety certifications had expired or lapsed.

Ten minutes before 23:00 on 24 December, observers aboard Rapuhia felt the ship jerk, and noticed that the navigational lights on Titan were no longer visible; further inspection found that the tow-line had snapped, and the barge was found nearby, having rolled over. The official report states that Rapuhia towed the barge south to a suitable area for scuttling, but several people involved in the salvage and scuttling operation claim that the towing cable wrapped around the propeller shafts, and both Rapuhia and Titan drifted without control until divers cut the cable free. The crane arm fell off while the pontoon was inverted.

After several days inspection, it was determined that the remains could not be salvaged, and plans were made to scuttle her. Subsequent investigation by the Department of Transport and Communication found that several rivets had failed on the starboard side of the pontoon, causing it to take large volumes of water. This loss of stability, combined with ocean and water conditions, plus the stresses of the tow, resulted in Titan rolling over and capsizing.

Citations

References

External links

Michael McFadyen's Scuba Diving Website - History of Titan and information regarding scuba diving at the wreck
National Archives of Australia - List of archived records relating to Cockatoo Island Dockyard, including some related to Titan

 

Floating cranes
Crane vessels
Individual cranes (machines)
Auxiliary ships of the Royal Australian Navy
1917 ships
Shipwrecks of the Mid North Coast Region
Ships built in New South Wales
Ships built in England
Maritime incidents in 1992
1992 in Australia